Payanam is a village in kanyakumari district, Tamil Nadu next to Unnamalaikadai. Total population is around 2k(~2000). 
Major religions are Hinduism and Christianity. Payanam tops as a largest agricultural village of unnamalaikadai town panchayat, by contributing 35% of its total food need.
 
Payanam village is situated 2 km from Marthandam and part of unnamalaikadai town panchayat. The entire payanam is blessed by Nature with a river, ponds and mountains (hills).
The brick industries, rubber groves, coconut plantations and paddy fields play main role in the economy of the village.
A river links remote villages with Payanam with the help of boat service. The boat service provides a cheap and economical mode of transport to remote villages like Thikkurichy, Vallakadavu, Nellikkai villai, ootichai, a popular Thikukurichy Shivan temple and a catholic church.

Payanam is also called temple village, meaning in which there is a temple for every family built to pray their family gods.

The Sree Chenbagavalli Amman Temple and Sree Chenbaga primary school are situated at the junction itself. Follow Shenbagavalli Amman temple payanam link to know cultural heritage of enchanting Chenbagavalli Amman temple.
Chenbagavalli auditorium is another feature of Payanam village, built to reduce the heavy marriage expenses suffered by Payanam people.
Back to marthandam down below 500 yards off from Payanam junction, there exist a Christian holy shrine, a holy gathering place for 25% Christians in Payanam village.

President: Jaya Seelan, Councilor: C. Rajan

Villages in Kanyakumari district